The Chief Commissioner's Province of Baluchistan was a province of British India established in 1876. Upon the creation of Pakistan it acceded to the newly formed state. It was part of the Baluchistan Agency. It was dissolved to form a united province of West Pakistan in 1955 upon the creation of One Unit Scheme.

History
The province was originally formed over the period 1876–1891 by three treaties between Robert Sandeman and the Khan of Kalat, Khudadad of Kalat. Sandeman became the Political Agent for the British-administered areas which were strategically located between British India and Afghanistan. A military base was established at Quetta which played a major part in the Second and Third Afghan Wars.

Balochistan was legally ceded to Pakistan by its rulers in 1947 and continued to be administered by a Chief Commissioner. It was dissolved in 1955 when most parts of the western wing of Pakistan became the new province of West Pakistan. West Pakistan was dissolved in 1970. Khan Abdul Wali Khan intended to transfer political power to the Pashtuns. The former Chief Commissioner's province was combined with the former Balochistan States Union and the enclave of Gwadar to form a new, larger Balochistan Province, with a Governor, a Chief Minister and a Provincial Assembly.

Demographics

The population of the province was equally split between Baloch tribes in the south and west and Pashtun tribes in the north.

Government
The province was administered by a Chief Commissioner appointed by the Federal Government. Although there was no elected legislature the Chief Commissioner could consult the Shahi Jirga, an assembly of tribal leaders.

The province comprised three groups of areas – the settled districts, the political agencies and the tribal area. The settled areas were mainly the district around Quetta and Jaffarabad. The agencies were the Zhob agency to the north of Quetta and the Chagai agency to the west, which had a tenuous land link with the rest of the province. The tribal areas were the Bugti and Marri tribal agencies which would later become Provincially Administered Tribal Areas in the new Balochistan province.

see List of Chief Commissioners of Baluchistan

See also
Balochistan province
Balochistan States Union
Makran
Las Bela
Kharan
Khanate of Kalat
Politics of Pakistan
History of Pakistan
Robert Groves Sandeman

Notes

External links
Government of Balochistan

1876 establishments in the British Empire
Former subdivisions of Pakistan
History of Balochistan, Pakistan (1947–present)
Provinces of British India